Scooby-Doo! The Sword and the Scoob is a 2021 American direct-to-DVD animated comedy film produced by Warner Bros. Animation and distributed by Warner Bros. Home Entertainment. It is the thirty-fifth entry in the direct-to-video series of Scooby-Doo films and was released on February 23, 2021.

Plot
After solving another mystery (similar to The Twilight Zones "Nightmare at 20,000 Feet"), DNA evidence reveals Shaggy's ancestry comes from a village in England believed to have once been Camelot. The gang travels to the village to learn about Shaggy's ancestors and discover that Shaggy is descended from a legendary knight who thwarted an attempt by Morgan La Fey from stealing the throne of Camelot from King Arthur.

During the night, Morgan La Fey attacks the gang and sends them back in time to the time of King Arthur. Realizing they are playing a part in the kingdom's legend, the gang decides to follow history until they can find a way back to the future. The plan is complicated when Shaggy pulls Excalibur from the stone and inadvertently challenges King Arthur's right to the throne. The right to the throne will be decided by a competition between knights, but Shaggy only gets Fred on his team while Arthur gets the entire Order of the Round Table.

Before the competition can start, Morgan La Fey temporarily paralyzes Fred so he cannot compete, forcing Daphne to take his place while Velma begins apprenticing under the wizard Merlin to find a way to the future. Daphne single-handedly defeats the knights of the round table and Shaggy is declared king, but Morgan La Fey kidnaps him. The gang and King Arthur follows him to Morgan La Fey's lair and discover Shaggy has been duped into signing over his right to the throne in exchange for a banquet. Morgan transforms into a dragon to destroy the gang, but they manage to defeat her.

Afterward, Velma reveals she discovered the whole adventure was a staged experience by the townsfolk and that the gang was never sent back in time. Fearing Shaggy might claim the town as his birthright, the town used a Camelot experience attraction, actors, and special effects to get Shaggy to sign over the deed to the town. Shaggy explains he has no interest in claiming the town, but the town librarian who posed as Morgan La Fey steals the deed to take all the profits from the attraction for herself. Using an animatronic dragon, the gang stops her and a party is thrown to celebrate. During the party, Velma learns that the town did not hire a Merlin actor and the one she encountered might have been the real thing.

Voice cast
 Frank Welker as Scooby-Doo, Fred Jones, Monster
 Grey Griffin as Daphne Blake, Morgan le Fay, Mrs. Wendy Wentworth, Dragon
 Matthew Lillard as Shaggy Rogers
 Kate Micucci as Velma Dinkley, Sandi
 Jason Isaacs as King Arthur Pendragon, Winston Pilkingstonshire, Thundarr the Barbarian
 Nick Frost as Merlin
 Greg Ellis as Herald, Herman Ellinger, British Passenger
 Ted Barton as Mayor Saunders, Sir Lancelot
 Spike Brandt as Mr. HB
 Trevor Devall as Man Cat
 Stephen Stanton as Peanut Vendor
 Fred Tatasciore as Black Knight
 Kari Wahlgren as Female Peasant

Production
Warner Bros. announced it in 2019 with a originally scheduled release in 2020. In December 2020, Syfy Wire exclusively announced the release date of February 23, 2021 with an accompanying trailer.

It was originally titled Scooby-Doo in King Arthur's Court, but it was retitled to Scooby-Doo! The Sword and the Scoob.

This was the first film to posthumously give special credit to original Scooby-Doo creators Joe Ruby and Ken Spears, who both died months before the film's release.

References

External links
 
 

2020s English-language films
2020s American animated films
2020s children's animated films
Films directed by Maxwell Atoms
Films based on television series
Warner Bros. Animation animated films
Warner Bros. direct-to-video animated films
2021 direct-to-video films
2021 animated films
2020s comedy horror films
American children's animated comedy films
American mystery films
Warner Bros. direct-to-video films
Scooby-Doo direct-to-video animated films
American direct-to-video films
American comedy horror films
Films produced by Sam Register
2021 comedy films
American sword and sorcery films
Animated films based on novels
Arthurian animated films
Films about wizards
Films based on British novels
Films based on fantasy novels
Animated films about dogs
Animated films set in London
Films set in the Middle Ages
Films set in the 5th century